is a Japanese politician of the Constitutional Democratic Party, a member of the House of Representatives in the Diet (national legislature). A native of Gero, Gifu he attended Sophia University as an undergraduate. Upon graduation, he joined Sanwa Bank in 1985 and worked in Chicago, Illinois for five years from 1989. He entered The Bank of Tokyo-Mitsubishi UFJ in 2004 as a currency trader. In 2009 he was elected to the House of Representatives for the first time and has been subsequently re-elected in 2012, 2014 and 2017.

References

External links
 Official website in Japanese.

Members of the House of Representatives (Japan)
Living people
1962 births
Democratic Party of Japan politicians
Japan Innovation Party politicians
Democratic Party (Japan, 2016) politicians
Sophia University alumni
21st-century Japanese politicians